Ni Haifeng (born 1964) in Zhoushan, China, is an installation artist. He currently lives and works in Amsterdam, Netherlands.

Biography
Ni worked as a schoolteacher at the Zhoushan Normal School, but was removed for being "too weird". He began painting onto parts of the landscape on the island where he lived in 1987, using chalk, paint, and dye to put marks on objects such as houses, stones, and trees.

By 2008 he was splitting his time between Beijing and Amsterdam.

In 2012 he exhibited in Manifesta 9.

References

External links
 Ni Haifeng's site

1964 births
Artists from Zhejiang
Living people
People from Zhoushan
Artists from Amsterdam
Chinese installation artists